Sant Pol de Mar is a municipality in the comarca of Maresme in Catalonia, Spain. It is located on the coast between Canet de Mar and Calella.  The national highway N-II and a station on the RENFE railway line link Sant Pol de Mar to the rest of the coast, while a local road links the town with Arenys de Munt.

Twin towns
 Andorra La Vella, Andorra

Sources

 Panareda Clopés, Josep Maria; Rios Calvet, Jaume; Rabella Vives, Josep Maria (1989). Guia de Catalunya, Barcelona: Caixa de Catalunya.  (Spanish).  (Catalan).

External links 

Official website 
 Government data pages 
Architectonical heritage in Sant Pol de Mar

Municipalities in Maresme